The 1996 Faber Grand Prix was a women's tennis tournament played on indoor carpet courts in Essen in Germany that was part of Tier II of the 1996 WTA Tour. It was the fourth edition of the tournament and was held from 19 February until 25 February 1996. First-seeded Iva Majoli won the singles title.

Finals

Singles

 Iva Majoli defeated  Jana Novotná 7–5, 1–6, 7–6(8–6)
 It was Majoli's 2nd title of the year and the 4th of her career.

Doubles

 Meredith McGrath /  Larisa Savchenko defeated  Lori McNeil /  Helena Suková 3–6, 6–3, 6–2
 It was McGrath's 1st title of the year and the 25th of her career. It was Savchenko's 2nd title of the year and the 61st of her career.

Prize money

References

External links
 ITF tournament edition details
 Tournament draws

Faber Grand Prix
Faber Grand Prix
Faber
1996 in German women's sport